The 2017 Doncaster Metropolitan Borough Council election took place on 4 May 2017 as part of the 2017 local elections in the United Kingdom. The election of the Mayor of Doncaster also took place on the same day. All 55 councillors were elected from 21 wards which returned either two or three councillors each by first-past-the-post voting for a four-year term of office.

The election resulted in the Labour Party retaining control of the Council, with an increased majority after gaining two seats from UKIP.

Result

Council Composition

Council composition
Following the last election in 2015, the composition of the council was:

After the election, the composition of the council was:

MF - Mexborough First 
I - Independent 
U - UKIP

Mayoral election

Ward results

Adwick-Le-Street and Carcroft

Armthorpe

Balby South

Bentley

Bessacarr

Conisbrough

Edenthorpe & Kirk Sandall

Edlington & Warmsworth

Finningley

Hatfield

Hexthorpe & Balby North

Mexborough

Norton & Askern

Roman Ridge

Rossington & Bawtry

Sprotbrough

Stainforth & Barnby Dun

Thorne & Moorends

Tickhill & Wadworth

Town

Wheatley Hills & Intake

References

2017
2017 English local elections
2010s in South Yorkshire